The Pony Super was a car built by NAMCO, a Greek vehicle manufacturer, between 1985 and 1992. It represented an effort by this company to produce a successor to its first generation Pony (Pony-Citroën), following the same principle of a versatile, cheap vehicle that could form a basis for several versions for different uses. In complete contrast to its predecessor, though, it failed in the Greek market, produced in only a few hundred units. 

The first generation Pony (introduced 10 years earlier) was an instant success, as it represented an extremely cheap and practical vehicle that managed to become a "fashion" in Greece. In fact, its original design (Baby-Brousse) was created by a team of French engineers in the Ivory Coast, and adopted by Citroën itself as an easy to produce "basic world car" platform (and indeed produced in several, mostly developing countries), in fact a predecessor of the Citroën FAF. The originally crude car was developed further and modernized by NAMCO, and was helped in the market by favorable taxation applied to vehicles of its category.  

The Pony Super was an entirely different car, using Ford mechanical components and developed by NAMCO (and Inthelco, a German company, at the time majority-owned by NAMCO).  A complete line-up was introduced (950 cc , 1100 cc , 1300 cc  and 1600 cc  diesel, in two- and four-door arrangements). An ambitious plan was also made to export the car to the U.S. with a 1900 cc engine via Inthelco as the Desta at a rate of 20,000 per year. However, the costs and prospects proved to be grossly miscalculated and the plan was abandoned.
 
Even in Greece, the new Pony failed as it was an obsolete design, while the tax law that had previously favored such "passenger-utility" vehicles had already been modified before the introduction of the new car.  Production was terminated in 1992, however a number of Pony Super’s was licence-produced in Bulgaria in 1994. 

Since the mid-1990s NAMCO has switched to trade and imports, but it has tried to retain a "vehicle producer" status, having made several attempts to sell designs and production technology of its vehicles (including those of the Pony Super) to developing nations.

References 

 L.S. Skartsis and G.A. Avramidis, "Made in Greece", Typorama, Patras, Greece (2003)  (republished by the Patras Science Park, 2007) 
L.S. Skartsis, "Greek Vehicle & Machine Manufacturers 1800 to present: A Pictorial History", Marathon (2012)  (eBook)  

Cars of Greece